Flames in the Dark is a 1942 Swedish drama film directed by Hasse Ekman.

Plot summary
Rolf Nordmark and Eva Berg both work as teachers at Ringsala boarding school. Rolf has long been in love with Eva, but when the semester begins again in the fall, he learns that she is to leave her job and marry a newly hired teacher at the school, Birger Sjögren.
Rolf and Eva continues their friendship, but Birger who is very jealous thinks that it is more than that and becomes more and more angry.

A series of mysterious fires begins to take place around the school. Per Sahlén, one of the students, is sure that he has seen the severe Latin teacher Sjögren setting fire to a barn. But can he convince the trusted and psychologically skilled teacher Nordmark of his suspicions in time to stop a disaster?

Cast 
Edvin Adolphson as Rolf Nordmark, Schoolmaster
Stig Järrel as Birger Sjögren, Schoolmaster
Inga Tidblad as Eva Berg
Hugo Björne as Edvard Bergfelt, Principal at Ringsala
Linnéa Hillberg as Magda Bergfelt, Principal's Wife
Hasse Ekman as Per Sahlén, Student
Agneta Lagerfeldt as Anne-Marie Ström, Waitress
Hilda Borgström as Anna Charlotta Sjögren, Birger Sjögren's mother

External links 
 

1942 films
Films directed by Hasse Ekman
1940s Swedish-language films
1942 drama films
Swedish drama films
Swedish black-and-white films
1940s Swedish films